Derby High School or "The Derby" as it is known locally, is a secondary school, located on Radcliffe Road, Bury, Greater Manchester, England. It opened in September 1959 as the Derby Grammar School, a new school that offered both a grammar and a technical education. Some of the pupils moved from Bury High School, a Grammar School on nearby Parliament Street, which closed when the Derby opened. They had gone there having passed the Eleven Plus examination. Other pupils came from Bury Junior Technical School having attended that school from the age of 13 years. The school was formed by merging those two schools into a grammar-technical school. In September 1979 it became a comprehensive school and its sixth form was closed. There are extensive playing fields to the front of the school and the school is easily recognised with its distinctive tower.

Uniform
The school uniform consists of a blazer with the school emblem on, dark trousers or a dark skirt for the girls, dark shoes and a school tie. The school tie is a navy blue background with diagonal smaller strips of gold and red, but the prefects wear a red tie. The boys wear sports shirts or joggers with white arms and a blue t-shirt and you can wear extras

History
The school's patron was the Earl of Derby, with the school's badge being based on the earl's coat of arms. Mr. G.A.C. Sawtell was the Headmaster from the opening until his retirement in 1977 when he was succeeded by Mr. Geoff Wolsternholme. The current Headmistress is Ms Helen Hubert who began leading Derby High School in 2016 after previous headteacher Ms Alison Byrne stepped down from teaching in the summer of 2015.

Buildings and grounds

The school is essentially a three storey building with a smaller single storey block at one end where Domestic Science and Practical Crafts such as woodwork and metalwork are taught. At the other end is the main entrance serving a large reception area, kitchen, offices and staff rooms. Above the reception area is the library and the school's distinctive tower. Behind the reception area is the school hall with a stage at the far end. Two gymnasiums run from the rear of the stage with one for boys at one side and opposite one for the girls.

There is also a small hut, originally used by the Sixth Form, behind the boys' gym. It was later used as a music room until it was recently converted to a dance and drama studio with its current name 'Inspire'. There is a caretaker's house at the side of the girls' gym. Extensive grounds lie at the front on the School; abutting the fields of Bury Church of England High School, Bury Rugby Union Football Club, Radcliffe Road and the grounds of Radcliffe Road Baptist Church and the gardens of houses on Inglewhite Close. A recently constructed (2014) sports hall is situated at the "town end" of the main school building. To the rear of the school is a rough track and the embankment of the Manchester Metrolink Tram line. Access by car is via Radcliffe Road or by foot and bike via a path, off Manchester Old Road which passes Bury C of E High School, to the rear of the school.

Houses
The school promoted the house system for internal competitions and prefect duties. Originally the school houses were Wren (after Christopher Wren) (house colour yellow), Stephenson (after George Stephenson) (house colour red), Newton (after Sir Isaac Newton) (house colour blue) and Rutherford (after Ernest Rutherford) (house colour green).

This changed in September 1979 when, as part of a Borough-wide reorganisation, the school became a 'comprehensive' high school. The Sixth Form was moved to Peel Six Form College, now part of Bury College. No longer offering an 'A' level syllabus, many long-serving members of staff left.

Form identities remained (1C, 2B, 3C...and so on up to F, with the number denoting the year group), however, the houses became Coniston (house colour light blue), Derwent (house colour blue), Grasmere (house colour green), Keswick (house colour red), Langdale (house colour orange) and Rydal (house colour yellow) – named after towns, villages and lakes in the Lake District. The school now has no house system. Today, form names are made up of the letters of DERBY SCH. For example, a year 11 form could be 11D.

Lowfield
The school held a property near Coniston called Lowfield. The property was bought by the school in the early 1960s and was converted over a number of years from a run down old mill into an outdoor pursuits centre. This old house provided many pupils with a weekend holiday in the Lake District. One "highlight" of any visit was a trek up the Old Man of Coniston and for some of the older boys, an attempt to gain entry to the Ship Inn which was facing the property at Bowmanstead. Lowfield has recently been sold and has been renovated (pictures are on the school's alumni website).

As well as a holiday, many pupils including Head Boy Jim Metcalf and Head Master George Sawtell worked on the property and made it 'livable' in the year after purchase. During such early work a stash of gelignite was found in the grounds.

Notable alumni and faculty

Alumni
Susan Bassnett, Academic. Pro-Vice-Chancellor at the University of Warwick, Professor in the Centre for Translation and Comparative Cultural Studies and author of over 20 books.
David Crausby, Member of Parliament (Labour) for Bolton North East since 1997.
Peter Skellern, Musician and Singer/Songwriter. First hit was "You're a Lady", in 1972, which reached number three in the UK Singles Chart.
 David Whittaker, Video Game Music Composer and Programmer, for most of the 1980s and early 1990s. Alumnus from 1968-1973.

Faculty
Dave Edmundson, P.E. teacher, went on to be Secretary of Lancashire County Cricket Club and then Chief Executive of Burnley Football Club. In 2007, he was appointed as general manager of a new body called the 'Football League Trust', to oversee Community and Youth Development activities at Football League clubs, arising from the Premier League's 'solidarity payments' to the League.
 Warren Bradley taught at the school in the mid '60s. He had played football for Manchester United immediately after the Munich air disaster. He was also capped for England. He coached the school first eleven which for a time included Jimmy Kerr, a young Scottish footballer who had come to the town to play for Bury.

References

External links

 Alumni webpage 
 2007 Ofsted report

Educational institutions established in 1959
Secondary schools in the Metropolitan Borough of Bury
1959 establishments in England
Community schools in the Metropolitan Borough of Bury
Schools in Bury, Greater Manchester